Ab Gazag (also Romanized as Āb Gazag) is a village in Zalaqi-ye Gharbi Rural District, Besharat District, Aligudarz County, Lorestan Province, Iran. In the 2006 census, its population was 89, with 15 families.

References 

Towns and villages in Aligudarz County